Parastagmatoptera simulacrum is a species of praying mantis in the family Mantidae. It is found in North America.

References

Stagmatopterinae
Articles created by Qbugbot
Insects described in 1793